Tom Moore (born 1952) is an American politician. He is a Republican who has represented District 18 in the Iowa House of Representatives since 2015.

Political career 

Moore was first elected to represent the 21st district in the Iowa House of Representatives in 2015, in a special election to replace Jack Drake, who had died. He has been in that position since.

Moore currently sits on the following committees:
 Education
 Environmental Protection
 Human Resources
 State Government
 Education Appropriations Subcommittee (Vice Chair)

References

Republican Party members of the Iowa House of Representatives
1952 births
Living people
21st-century American politicians